Pitcairnia pruinosa, synonym Pepinia pruinosa, is a species of flowering plant in the family Bromeliaceae, native to Colombia and Venezuela. It was first described by Carl Sigismund Kunth in 1816.

References

pruinosa
Flora of Colombia
Flora of Venezuela
Plants described in 1816